This article is a list of historical Irish plant collectors.  An important part of taxonomy and botany is the collection of samples from different locales.

 John Ball (1818–1889), first president Alpine Club, 1858–1860
 Evelyn Booth (1897–1988), parts of her collection are in the National Botanic Gardens, Glasnevin
 Patrick Browne, doctor and botanist in Jamaica
 Thomas Coulter (1793–1843), collected plants in North and Latin America
 Lady Charlotte Wheeler Cuffe (née Williams) (1867–1967)
 Michael Pakenham Edgeworth (1812–1881), born in Edgeworthstown, County Longford; namesake of genus Edgeworthia
 Eugene Fitzalan (1830–1911), born in Derry; collector, nurseryman, and poet
Robert D. FitzGerald (1830–1892), born in Tralee; botanist, artist, collector; collected orchids 
 Dr. A. Gogarty, sent plants, seeds, orchids, ferns and bulbs to the Irish National Botanic Gardens
 William Henry Harvey (1811–1866), born in Limerick, collected plants in South Africa 1848–66
 Augustine Henry
 James Keys (1841–1916), born in Irvinestown, County Fermanagh
 Edward Madden, from Kilkenny
 John Madden (1837–1902), Clones, County Monaghan; claimed in his North American expeditions to have introduced the Douglas fir
 Robert Patterson (1802–1872), Belfast, collected in Ireland, Australia
 Samuel Alexander Stewart 
 Whan William Taylor (1829–1901), born in Moneymore, County Londonderry
 William Thomas Locke Travers (1819–1903), born in Dundalk

References

Darwin Correspondence online Database, Cambridge University

See also
 List of Irish botanical illustrators
 The Ferns of Great Britain and Ireland

Plant
Irish